Events from the year 1520 in India.

Events
19 May – The Battle of Raichur is fought.

Births
 Francisco Barreto, later viceroy of Portuguese India is born in Faro (dies 1558)
 Appayya Dikshitar, performer of yajñas is born at Adayapalam, in the Tiruvannamalai district (dies 1593)

Deaths

See also

 Timeline of Indian history

References

 
India